Richard Markham is an English classical pianist. He was born in Grimsby, England, where he studied with Shirley Kemp and attended Wintringham Grammar School.  By the age of 16 he had been awarded the LRAM and ARCM Performing Diplomas, become a member of the National Youth Orchestra of Great Britain, and won a scholarship to study with Max Pirani at the Royal Academy of Music in London.  Whilst still a student he was a prizewinner at the Geneva International Competition, and he made his London debut in 1974 appearing as soloist with the English Chamber Orchestra under Raymond Leppard at the Queen Elizabeth Hall.

His concert appearances take him throughout the UK and he has performed at major festivals such as Aldeburgh, Harrogate, City of London, Cheltenham, Bath and York.  He has appeared as soloist with leading orchestras including the London Symphony, London Philharmonic, Royal Philharmonic, Philharmonia, English Chamber, London Mozart Players, Hallé, Royal Scottish, Ulster, and the BBC Philharmonic, Scottish and Concert Orchestras.  He has given a number of highly acclaimed concerto performances at the Royal Festival Hall, the Barbican and the Royal Albert Hall.

Most of Markham's career is now devoted to his piano duo with David Nettle, and their concert tours have taken them to Australia, the Far East, the Middle East, North America and throughout Europe.  In 1987, they appeared in both the BBC Promenade Concerts and the Berlin Festival and in 1988 at the Schleswig-Holstein Festival.  More recent European tours have included the Dvořák Hall in Prague, the Philharmonie in Berlin, the Singer-Polignac Foundation in Paris and the Concertgebouw in Amsterdam.  In the last few seasons they have had fourteen major tours of the US, appearing in over 30 states and travelling a total of 70,000 miles.  They celebrated the thirtieth anniversary of their duo in June at a recital in London's Cadogan Hall as part of its Celebrity Recital Series.

Markham has appeared on TV in several countries and has featured in three TV documentaries.  A frequent broadcaster on Classic FM and BBC Radios 2, 3 and 4, his recordings include Holst's own two-piano version of The Planets, which won the Music Retailers' Award for Best Chamber Music record in 1985, the wide-ranging two-piano repertoire in Nettle & Markham in America (featuring their own transcription Scenes from West Side Story), Nettle & Markham in England (ranging from popular fare like the Warsaw Concerto to relative rarities like Madeleine Dring's Fantastic Variations on Lilliburlero) and Nettle & Markham in France, The Complete Two-Piano Works of Brahms, Saint-Saëns’ Carnival of the Animals and Stravinsky's own piano duet version of The Rite of Spring and Petrushka.

References

Year of birth missing (living people)
Living people
English classical pianists
People from Grimsby
Alumni of the Royal Academy of Music
21st-century classical pianists